Route 204 is a collector road in the Canadian province of Nova Scotia.

It is located in Cumberland County and runs from Amherst at Trunk 6 to Streets Ridge at Route 368.

Route description
Heading east from the Town of Amherst the route is a two-lane collector highway with a posted speed limit of 80 km/h. In Oxford town limits the route follows Little River Road, Main Street, Water Street and Birchwood Road. From Oxford it continues heading due east with a posted speed limit of 80 km/h until its terminus at Route 368. It was originally  part of Trunk 4 until 1970.

Communities
Amherst
Brookdale
Salem
Little River
West Leicester
Hansford
South Victoria
Oxford
Streets Ridge

History
Route 204 has been around unofficially for many decades and for many years was the main road between Truro and Amherst. Before the current alignment of Highway 104 was constructed the route was part of the Trans Canada Highway.

Before the 1960s, the section of Route 204 from Oxford to Streets Ridge was designated as Trunk 4.

See also
List of Nova Scotia provincial highways

References

204
204
Amherst, Nova Scotia